Herbert Charles Hollyman (May 4, 1940 – May 6, 1980) was an American football coach.  Hollyman was the 12th head football coach  at Dickinson State College—now known as Dickinson State University–in Dickinson, North Dakota and held that position for one season, in 1971.  His coaching record at Dickinson State was 2–6.

The Herb Hollyman Memorial Scholarship is named in his honor.

Head coaching record

References

External links
 

1940 births
1980 deaths
Dickinson State Blue Hawks football coaches
People from Laramie, Wyoming